The 13th Rajasthan Legislative Assembly was elected in 2008.

This is a list of members representing the state of Rajasthan in the 13th Rajasthan Legislative Assembly. There were 200 members of the legislative assembly with the Bharatiya Janata Party forming the 73 seats, followed by the Indian National Congress with 112.

By constituency

Communist Party of India (Marxist)
Pawan Kumar Duggal
Pemaram 	
Amra Ram

Independent

Ajay Dhandia
Harji Ram Burdak 	
Brahmdev Kumawat
Nanalal Ninama 	
Kanhaiya Lal Awasthi 	
Ram Kishor Siani 		
Parsadi Lal Meena 		
Gurmeet Singh Kunnar 	
Jaideep Dudi 		
Jeevaram Choudhary	
Dilip Choudhary 	
Ranveer Pahalwan
Govind Singh Lulwa khas
Durg Singh

Indian National Congress

Nathu Ram Sinodiya
Naseem Akhtar Insaf 	
Mahendra Singh 	
Raghu Sharma 		
Aimaduddin Ahmad Khan
Major O P Yadav 	
Tikaram Julee 		
Kanta Garasiya 	
Arjun Singh Bamaniya 	
Mahendrajeet Singh
Pramod Jain 'Bhaya' 	
Nirmala Sahria 	
Panachand Meghwal	
Karan Singh Rathore 	
Ameen Khan 	
Mewaram Jain 	
Col Sonaram Choudhary 	
Madan Prajapat 	
Hemaram Choudhary 	
Padmaram Meghwal 	
Zahida 	
Ramlal Jat 	
Kailash Chandra Trivedi 	
Mahaveer Prasad Jingar 	
Pradeep Kumar Singh 	
Virendra Beniwal 	
Manglaram Godara 	
C L Premi
Shankar Lal Bairwa
Rajender Singh Bidhudi
Govind Singh Lulwa khas
Udailal Anjana 	
Prakash Chandra Chaudhary 	
Hazi Maqbool Mandelia 	
Master Bhanwarlal 	
Mamta Bhupesh 	
Murari Lal Meena 		
Girraj Singh Malinga 	
Lal Shankar Gatiya 			
Raiya Meena	
Surendra Kumar 	
Shankar Lal Ahari 	
Santosh Kumar Saharan
Ganga Jal Meel 		
Daulat Raj Nayak 		
Paramnavadeep Singh 	
Vinod Kumar Lilawali 	
Aadram Meghwal 	
Bhagwan Sahay Saini 	
Babu Lal Nagar 		
Ganga Sahay Sharma 	
Gopal Meena 	
Brij Kishore Sharma	
Pratap Singh  	
Ganga Devi 	
Shaleh Mohammad 	
Bhag Raj Chowdhary
Ramlal Meghwal 		
Ratan Dewasi
Madan Lal Verma 	
Kailash Chand Meena 	
Sharwan Kumar 	
Brijendra Singh Ola 	
Rita Choudhary 	
Dr Rajkumar Sharma 	
Rajendra Singh Gudha 	
Jitendra Singh 	
Om Joshi	
Mahipal Maderana 	
Ashok Hakliya  	
Malkhan Singh BISHNOI 		
Bharosi Lal Jatav 	
Ramesh Chand Meena 	
Premchand Nagar 	
Bharat Singh Kundanpur 	
Shanti Kumar Dhariwal 	
Rupa Ram Dudi 	
Manju Devi 	
Zakir Hussain Gaisawat		
Mahendra Choudhary 	
Bina Kak 	
Ganesh Singh Parmar	
Ramkesh Meena 	
Nawal Kishor Meena 	
Alauddin Azad 	
Ashok Bairwa 'Khandar' 	
Bhanwaru Khan 	
Govind Singh Dotasra 	
Rajendra Pareek 		
Ramesh Khandelwal 	
Deependra Singh
Ganga Ben Garasiya 	
Kamal Bairwa
Zakiya 	
Ramnarayan Meena 	 	
Mangi Lal Garasiya
Dayaram Parmar 	
Sajjan Katara 	
Pushkar Lal Dangi 	 	
Gajendra Singh Shaktawat 	
Basanti Devi Meena
Nagraj Meena 	
Brahmdev Kumawat

Janata Dal (United)
Fateh Singh

References

Members
Rajasthan Legislative Assembly
Rajasthan MLAs 2008–2013
Lists of state legislators of Indian States